25 Corps, 25th Corps, Twenty Fifth Corps, or XXV Corps may refer to:

 XXV Reserve Corps (German Empire), a unit during World War I
 XXV Corps (Ottoman Empire)
 25th Army Corps (Soviet Union)
 XXV Army Corps (Wehrmacht)
 XXV Corps (Union Army), a unit during the American Civil War
 XXV Corps, a British deception formation during World War II

See also
 List of military corps by number
 25th Army (disambiguation)
 25th Brigade (disambiguation)
 25th Regiment (disambiguation)
 25 Squadron (disambiguation)